Pascali may refer to:

Manuel Pascali (born 1981), Italian professional footballer
Pino Pascali (1935–1968), Italian artist, sculptor, set designer and performer
Pascali (grape), red Italian wine grape

See also
Pascali's Island (disambiguation)
Paschalis (disambiguation)
Pascal (disambiguation)
Pasqual (disambiguation)
Pasquale (disambiguation)
Pascual (disambiguation)
Pascale